Preziosi may refer to: 
 Giochi Preziosi, Italian toy company

People with the surname
 Alessandro Preziosi, Italian actor
 Amedeo Preziosi (1816–1882), Maltese artist
 Carmine Preziosi, Italian road cyclist
 Donald Preziosi (born 1941), American art historian
 Enrico Preziosi, Italian entrepreneur
 Giovanni Preziosi, Italian Fascist politician